John Sutton (fl. late 15th century) was one of the composers of the Eton Choirbook. Sutton was a Fellow of Magdalen College, Oxford, in 1476; one year later he was elected for the fellowship at Eton College; there are no more references to his name in the Eton records after 1479. He may have been the same "Sutton" who graduated MusB at Cambridge in 1489.

Only one work by him survives, a Salve Regina in seven parts.

References

Year of birth unknown
Year of death unknown
Renaissance composers
English classical composers
16th-century English composers
15th-century English people
Fellows of Magdalen College, Oxford
English male classical composers